Leonard William Schuetz (November 16, 1887 – February 13, 1944) was a U.S. Representative from Illinois.

Schuetz was born in Posen, Germany (later Poland), November 16, 1887. In 1888 he immigrated to the United States with his father, who settled in Chicago, Illinois. He attended the public schools, Lane Technical High School, and Bryant and Stratton Business College, Chicago, Illinois. He engaged as a stenographer and secretary until 1906, when he became associated with Swift &amp.
Co. in an executive capacity.
Organized the Schuetz Construction Co. in 1923 and served as its president and treasurer.

Schuetz was elected as a Democrat to the Seventy-second and to the six succeeding Congresses and served from March 4, 1931, until his death in Washington, D.C., on February 13, 1944. He was interred in St. Adabert's Cemetery, Chicago, Illinois.

See also
 List of United States Congress members who died in office (1900–49)

References

Leonard William Schuetz, Late A Representative

1887 births
1944 deaths
Politicians from Chicago
Democratic Party members of the United States House of Representatives from Illinois
German emigrants to the United States
20th-century American politicians
Bryant and Stratton College alumni